Shiloh Presbyterian Church Cemetery is a historic Presbyterian cemetery located near Grover, in Cleveland County, North Carolina and Cherokee County, South Carolina. It was established in 1780 in conjunction with the construction of the Shiloh Meeting House. Revolutionary War hero William Patterson, who died on October 5, 1780, the day of the Battle of Kings Mountain, and was the first person interred at the cemetery. The cemetery is the oldest burying ground in the southeast section of Cleveland County, North Carolina.  It includes a number of notable gravestones carved from greenish schist and soapstone dating from 1780s to the 1820s. The cemetery includes 104 gravestones in the North Carolina section of the property, and four gravestones in the South Carolina section.

It was listed on the National Register of Historic Places in 2011.

References

External links
 
 

Cemeteries on the National Register of Historic Places in North Carolina
Cemeteries on the National Register of Historic Places in South Carolina
Buildings and structures in Cleveland County, North Carolina
Buildings and structures in Cherokee County, South Carolina
National Register of Historic Places in Cleveland County, North Carolina
National Register of Historic Places in Cherokee County, South Carolina